The 1983 Winston Western 500 was a NASCAR Winston Cup Series race that took place on November 20, 1983, at Riverside International Raceway in Riverside, California.

Qualifying

Race recap
There were 42 drivers; 40 of them were American-born while Roy Smith and Trevor Boys were born in Canada. 

Ricky Rudd started on the front row but retired from the lead with a blown engine in his last outing for Richard Childress in the #3 Piedmont Airlines Chevrolet. Dale Earnhardt would start his final NASCAR Winston Cup Series race in a Ford; bringing home Bud Moore's #15 Wrangler Thunderbird with a top-5 finish. James "J.D." Stacy would mark his final race as an official NASCAR team owner at this race. Stacy came in with promises and a lot of cash but proved to be a charlatan. The Sterling Marlin and Trevor Boys battle for rookie of the year came down to the last race of the year with the Canadian Boys leading coming into the final race by approximately 16 points. Marlin came from behind to claim the honor after scoring a top-20 finish while mechanical problems in this final race doomed Boys' hopes.

Buddy Arrington was the 23rd place finisher after dropping out of the race on lap 109 due to wheel issues in his Chrysler Cordoba. Sumner McKnight finished in 19th place after completing 114 of the regulation laps.

Bobby Allison secured his only Winston Cup Championship during the course of the race.

Jimmy Insolo quit the race on the first lap due to team issues. Joe Ruttman blew his engine on lap 12 while Bill Schmidt would ruin his engine on lap 13. Rick McCray's engine would stop working on lap 29. Meanwhile, ignition problems would take out Ron Esau on lap 32 at the same time Ricky Rudd suffered from a faulty engine. The ignition on Roy Smith's vehicle stopped working on lap 36 while the throttle on Jim Bown's vehicle gave out on lap 37. Between lap 38 and lap 61, four drivers were forced to exit the race due to engine concerns.

Bill Elliott defeated Benny Parsons under the final caution flag in front of 24,000 spectators for his first-ever Cup Series victory. The race concluded under caution because of a rain shower. This was Elliott's first Cup win. Just under 35 years later his son Chase Elliott also scored his first Cup win, also on a road course, winning at Watkins Glen in 2018. Bill Elliott won this race driving a 1982 Ford Thunderbird as opposed to the slicker 1983 model; the team used the older car on road courses and short tracks this season.

There were 13 lead changes and five caution flags for 26 laps; making the race last three hours and fifteen minutes.

Jimmy Insolo, Doug Wheeler, Don Waterman, Pat Mintey, and Randy Becker would retire from NASCAR Cup Series racing after this event.

Drivers who failed to qualify were: Bobby Hillin Jr. (#6), Dan Noble (#37), Tony Settember (#58), Harry Goularte (#17), Steve Pfeifer (#8), St. James Davis (#02), Mark Perry (#1) and Bob Kennedy (#94).

This was the last race without Rusty Wallace until the 2006 Daytona 500.

Results

Standings after the race

References

Winston Western 500
Winston Western 500
NASCAR races at Riverside International Raceway